Francis Marshall (1904 – 14 July 1928) was a Scottish professional footballer who played in the Football League for Brentford and Gillingham as an inside forward. He made over 100 appearances for the latter club.

Career 
Marshall began his career in Scotland as a youth with Shawfield Juniors and progressed to play for hometown club Shettleston. He had trial spells with Scottish league clubs Rangers, Falkirk and Partick Thistle, before moving to England to join Third Division South club Gillingham in 1924. He flourished under Harry Curtis' management and made over 100 appearances for the Gills. Curtis departed Priestfield in May 1926 to take over the manager's job at league rivals Brentford and Marshall followed in January 1927 for a £500 fee. He took over as the team's right half for the remainder of the 1926–27 season and made 21 appearances. He failed to make an appearance during the 1927–28 season due to illness.

Personal life 
Marshall returned to Glasgow for a summer holiday in 1927 and caught tuberculosis, from which he died in July 1928.

Career statistics

References

1904 births
1928 deaths
Footballers from Glasgow
Scottish footballers
English Football League players
Scottish Football League players
Shawfield F.C. players
Rangers F.C. players
Falkirk F.C. players
Gillingham F.C. players
Brentford F.C. players
Glasgow United F.C. players
Association football inside forwards
Association football wing halves
20th-century deaths from tuberculosis
Tuberculosis deaths in Scotland